Vello Jürna (1 December 1959 Väike-Maarja – 12 June 2007 Laulasmaa, Keila Parish) was an Estonian opera singer (tenor).

In 1991 he graduated from the Tallinn Conservatory. From 1982 until 1987, he sang in the Estonian National Male Choir, and from 1987 until 1989, in the Estonia Theatre's choir. Since 1989, he's sang at the Estonia Theatre. In 1990s he song also in several choirs outside Estonia, eg in Royal Swedish Opera.

Awards:
 1992: Estonian Cultural Prize

Operatic roles

 Jonas Kempe (Tubin's "Reigi õpetaja", 1988)
 Ferrando (Mozart's "Così fan tutte", 1989; 1998 in Oulu)
 Nemorino (Donizetti's "Armujook", 1989)

References

1959 births
2007 deaths
21st-century Estonian male opera singers
Estonian Academy of Music and Theatre alumni
People from Väike-Maarja
Burials at Metsakalmistu
20th-century Estonian male opera singers